The 7th Rhode Island Cavalry Squadron was a cavalry squadron that served in the Union Army during the American Civil War.

Service
The 7th Rhode Island Cavalry Squadron was organized in Providence, Rhode Island and mustered in June 24, 1862, for three months' service.  It consisted of two companies, Company A and Company B, under the command of Major Augustus W. Corliss.

The companies moved to Washington, D.C., June 28–30 and were attached to Military District of Washington, Wadsworth's Command, to July 1862. Sturgis' Command, Military District of Washington, to August 1862. Winchester, Virginia, to September 1862. Miles' Command, Harpers Ferry, West Virginia, September, 1862.

Served duty at Camp Clark and Camp Sprague, defenses of Washington, until July 25, 1862. Moved to Alexandria, Virginia, July 25, then to Winchester, Virginia, August 1. Served duty at Camp Sigel, Winchester, until September 3. Retreated to Newtown and Middleburg, then to Harpers Ferry, September 3–4. Maryland Heights September 12–13. Defense of Harpers Ferry September 13–15. Escaped through enemy's lines September 15 and participated in the capture of 100 wagons of Longstreet's supply train September 16.

The 7th Squadron, Rhode Island Cavalry mustered out September 26, 1862.

Commanders
 Major Augustus Whittemore Corliss

See also

 List of Rhode Island Civil War units
 Rhode Island in the American Civil War

Notes

References
 Corliss, Augustus Whittemore. History of the Seventh Squadron, Rhode Island Cavalry (Yarmouth, ME:  "Old Times" Office), 1879.
 Dyer, Frederick H.  A Compendium of the War of the Rebellion (Des Moines, IA:  Dyer Pub. Co.), 1908.
   [Author was a corporal in Company A.]
   [Author was a private and veterinary surgeon in Company B.]
Attribution
 

Military units and formations established in 1862
Military units and formations disestablished in 1862
Units and formations of the Union Army from Rhode Island
1862 establishments in Rhode Island